Series 20 of Top Gear, a British motoring magazine and factual television programme, was broadcast in the United Kingdom on BBC Two during 2013, consisting of six episodes between 30 June and 4 August. Following the previous series, the programme replaced the Kia Cee'd with the Vauxhall Astra Tech Line as its "Reasonably Priced Car", effectively wiping the Celebrity Lap Board clean for new times. This series' highlights included a race between a car and a yacht around New Zealand, a budget convertible trip across Spain, the presenters creating a hovercraft out of a van, and a tribute piece to the British motor industry.

Episodes

References

2013 British television seasons
Top Gear seasons